Arietellidae is a family of copepods belonging to the order Calanoida.

Genera
The family contains the following genera:

Arietellus 
Campaneria 
Crassarietellus 
Griceus 
Metacalanalis 
Metacalanus 
Paramisophria 
Paraugaptiloides 
Paraugaptilus 
Pilarella 
Protoparamisophria 
Rhapidophorus 
Sarsarietellus 
Scutogerulus

References

Copepods